In mathematics, Sylvester’s criterion is a necessary and sufficient criterion to determine whether a Hermitian matrix is positive-definite. It is named after James Joseph Sylvester.

Sylvester's criterion states that a n × n Hermitian matrix M is positive-definite if and only if all the following matrices have a positive determinant:
 the upper left 1-by-1 corner of M,
 the upper left 2-by-2 corner of M,
 the upper left 3-by-3 corner of M,
 
 M itself.
In other words, all of the leading principal minors must be positive. By using appropriate permutations of rows and columns of M, it can also be shown that the positivity of any nested sequence of n principal minors of M is equivalent to M being positive-definite.

An analogous theorem holds for characterizing positive-semidefinite Hermitian matrices, except that it is no longer sufficient to consider only the leading principal minors:
a Hermitian matrix M is positive-semidefinite if and only if all principal minors of M are nonnegative.

Simple proof for special case 
Suppose is  Hermitian matrix . Let  be the principal minor matrices, i.e. the  upper left corner matrices. It will be shown that if  is positive definite, then the principal minors are positive; that is,  for all .  

 is positive definite. Indeed, choosing 
 
 
<p>To prove the reverse implication, we use induction. The general form of an  Hermitian matrix is
 ,

Denote
 
then
 
By completing the squares, this last expression is equal to
 
 
The first term is positive by the inductive hypothesis. We now examine the sign of the second term. By using the block matrix determinant formula

on  we obtain
 , which implies . 
Consequently,

Proof for general case 

Theorem I: A real-symmetric matrix A has nonnegative eigenvalues if and only if A can be factored as A = BTB, and all eigenvalues are positive if and only if B is nonsingular.

Theorem II (The Cholesky decomposition): The symmetric matrix A possesses positive pivots if and only if A can be uniquely factored as A = RTR, where R is an upper-triangular matrix with positive diagonal entries. This is known as the Cholesky decomposition of A, and R is called the Cholesky factor of A.

Theorem III: Let Ak be the k × k leading principal submatrix of An×n. If A has an LU factorization A = LU, where L is a lower triangular matrix with a unit diagonal, then det(Ak) = u11u22 · · · ukk, and the k-th pivot is ukk = det(A1) = a11 for k = 1, ukk = det(Ak)/det(Ak−1) for k = 2, 3, . . . , n, where ukk is the (k, k)-th entry of U for all k = 1, 2, . . . , n.

Combining Theorem II with Theorem III yields:

Statement I: If the symmetric matrix A can be factored as A=RTR where R is an upper-triangular matrix with positive diagonal entries, then all the pivots of A are positive (by Theorem II), therefore all the leading principal minors of A are positive (by Theorem III).

Let rjj be the (j, j)-th entry of R for all j = 1, 2, . . . , n. Then rjj ≠ 0 for all j = 1, 2, . . . , n.

Let F be a diagonal matrix, and let fjj be the (j, j)-th entry of F for all j = 1, 2, . . . , n. For all j = 1, 2, . . . , n, we set fjj = 1 if rjj > 0, and we set fjj = -1 if rjj < 0. Then , the n × n identity matrix.

Let S=FR. Then S is an upper-triangular matrix with all diagonal entries being positive. Hence we have , for some upper-triangular matrix S with all diagonal entries being positive.

Namely Statement II requires the non-singularity of the symmetric matrix A.

Combining Theorem I with Statement I and Statement II yields:

Statement III: If the real-symmetric matrix A is positive definite then A possess factorization of the form A = BTB, where B is nonsingular (Theorem I), the expression A = BTB implies that A possess factorization of the form A = RTR where R is an upper-triangular matrix with positive diagonal entries (Statement II), therefore all the leading principal minors of A are positive (Statement I).

In other words, Statement III proves the "only if" part of Sylvester's Criterion for non-singular real-symmetric matrices.

Sylvester's Criterion: The real-symmetric matrix A is positive definite if and only if all the leading principal minors of A are positive.

Notes

References 

 .
 . Theorem 7.2.5.
 .

Articles containing proofs
Matrix theory

fr:Matrice définie positive#Critère de Sylvester